Chopin Hill is a low, snow-covered hill, about  high, lying  southwest of Mount Schumann lying on the base of Harris Peninsula, Beethoven Peninsula, southwest Alexander Island, Antarctica. It was first mapped, from air photos taken by the Ronne Antarctic Research Expedition, 1947–48, by D. Searle of the Falkland Islands Dependencies Survey in 1960, and named by the UK Antarctic Place-Names Committee after Frédéric Chopin, the Polish composer.

References 

Hills of Palmer Land
Landforms of Alexander Island
Poland and the Antarctic